Óscar Agudelo (born 1932) is a Colombian musician, popularly known as "El Zorzal Criollo". He is acknowledged to be the finest Colombian proponent of la canción sureña.

He was born in Fresno, Tolima in 1932. He studied in Ibagué, before developing as an artist in Pereira and Medellín. He made his debut in Girardot with the song Hojas de Calendario. There he formed a trio with the musicians Nelson Ibarra and Alfonso Medina, and from 1953 started to record discs. Between 1957 and 1960, he lived in Perú, Chile, Paraguay, Uruguay and Argentina. Although best known for la canción sureña, the tango also forms an important part of his repertory.

He lives in Bogota.

References

20th-century Colombian male singers
1932 births
Living people
Colombian expatriates in Peru
Colombian expatriates in Chile
Colombian expatriates in Paraguay
Colombian expatriates in Uruguay
Colombian expatriates in Argentina